Crime in Bulgaria is combated by the Bulgarian police and other agencies. The United States Department of State's Bureau of Diplomatic Security ranks Bulgaria's crime rating as High.

Crime by type

Murder 

In 2018, Bulgaria had a murder rate of 1.8 per 100,000 population. There were a total of 155 murders in Bulgaria in 2016.

Contract killings by organized crime was a problem but mostly decreased following the arrest of five “Killers” gang members starting in 2010. In 2014, another “Killers” group was suspected of being responsible for the contract killing of Customs officers in 1998. In 2014, four contract murders that targeted criminals were reported. One suspect was eventually arrested.

Corruption 

Corruption is a problem in Bulgaria. In 2011, a survey showed that one out of every four Bulgarians who dealt with doctors, police officers, customs officials or judges offered money, a gift or a favour to see their problems solved.

In 2006 the European Commission established goals for Bulgaria to improve its fight against corruption and organised crime.  In the 2011 Corruption Perceptions Index, Bulgaria ranked 86th out of 182 countries. They scored a 3.3 with 10 the highest possible.

Corruption is viewed as an obstacle to doing business in Bulgaria. Kickbacks and bribes are a norm in the public procurement sector, a practice which decreases opportunities for foreign investors. Domestic companies sometimes face demands for payments or bribes when they register their business or try to get access to public utilities.

Bulgaria's criminal code outlaws many types of corruption, but enforcement of the laws is weak.

Bulgaria's voters voted in a parliamentary election on March 26, 2017. This was the country's third major election since 2013. According to Transparency International Bulgaria, “Bulgarian citizens are disappointed with the functioning of institutions.”

Corruption Perceptions Index 
The Corruption Perceptions Index, published by Transparency International, scores countries on how corrupt their public sectors are viewed. Countries are ranked from 0 (highly corrupt) to 100 (very clean). Bulgaria's 2016 score was 41. Among the 176 countries scored, Bulgaria was ranked number 75—tied with Kuwait, Tunisia and Turkey.

The table shows Bulgaria's scores between 2012 and 2016:

European Commission Bulgarian corruption benchmarks 
In 2006 the European Commission established goals for Bulgaria to improve its fight against corruption and organised crime.[3] These goals were based on the Treaty on European Union, the Treaty of Accession of the Republic of Bulgaria and Romania, and opinions expressed by EU member states. The Commission noted specific problematic areas in the accountability and efficiency of the judicial and law enforcement systems.

The European Commission adopted a series of specific benchmarks for Bulgaria to reach:
 “Adopt constitutional amendments removing any ambiguity regarding the independence and accountability of the judicial system.”
 “Ensure a more transparent and efficient judicial process by adopting and implementing a new judicial system act and the new civil procedure code. Report on the impact of these new laws and of the penal and administrative procedure codes, notably on the pre-trial phase.”
 “Continue the reform of the judiciary in order to enhance professionalism, accountability and efficiency. Evaluate the impact of this reform and publish the results annually.” 
 “Conduct and report on professional, non-partisan investigations into allegations of high-level corruption. Report on internal inspections of public institutions and on the publication of assets of high-level officials.”
 “Take further measures to prevent and fight corruption, in particular at the borders and within local government.”
 “Implement a strategy to fight organised crime, focusing on serious crime, money laundering as well as on the systematic confiscation of assets of criminals. Report on new and ongoing investigations, indictments and convictions in these areas.”

Corporate raiding 
Corporate raiding is the practice of illegally taking over a company via manipulation of government power. It has three main components:
 A corrupt judiciary that fabricates (makes up) criminal charges against the victim;
 A corrupt media that, in coordination with the government, runs a “black PR” campaign, which spreads lies about the victim's company (usually causing a panic among the company's customers);
 Corrupt regulatory officials who use government power to seize the target's asset and distribute them to the criminals.
In 2014, Corporate Commercial Bank—the country's fourth largest bank whose financial portfolio made up ten percent of Bulgaria's GDP—was hit by a bank run after prosecutors and the media televised a raid of the bank's offices. Soon thereafter, criminal charges were filed against the bank's owner, Tzevetan Vassilev. Many officials believe the bank run was organized by a group of senior-level government officials. After the bank run, the bank collapsed, “causing a financial crisis in the country and widespread economic hardship for Bulgarian citizens.”

According to Balkan Business Wire, “Between 2013 and 2014, the country of Bulgaria saw one of its largest and most successful banks demolished by a trio of a corrupt judiciary, corrupt media, and corrupt government officials in a classic corporate raiding scheme.”

Corporate Commercial Bank's financial portfolio made up ten percent of the Bulgaria's GDP. After the corporate raiding scheme was carried out, the bank was shut down, its assets were stolen, and depositors lost their savings.

Organised crime 

Bulgarian organised crime groups are involved in a wide range of activities, including drug trafficking, cigarette smuggling, human trafficking, prostitution, illicit antiquities trafficking, extortion (often under the cover of ostensible security and insurance companies) and the arms trade. They appear to have connections with the Russian Mafia, Serbian Mafia, and the Italian Cosa Nostra.

Human trafficking 

Bulgaria is a source and, to a lesser extent, a transit and destination country for women and children who are subjected to trafficking in persons, specifically forced prostitution and men, women, and children subjected to conditions of forced labor.

By location

Varna

The city of Varna is known to be the main hub for Bulgarian organized crime. Some sectors of the economy, including gambling, corporate security, tourism, real estate, and professional sports, are believed to be controlled in part by business groups with links to Communist-era secret services or the military; the TIM group, based in Varna, is one example.

See also
 Macedonian Mafia

References